Asper is a surname. Notable people with the surname include:

 David Asper, Vice-president of CanWest Global Communications Corp.
 Frank W. Asper (1892–1973), Latter-day Saint composer and Mormon Tabernacle organist.
 Gail Asper, President of the CanWest Global Foundation and managing director and secretary of The Asper Foundation
 Hans Asper (1499–1571), Swiss painter
 Izzy Asper (1932–2003), Canadian media magnate
 Leonard Asper, President and CEO of CanWest Global Communications Corp.
 Linda Asper, Manitoba politician
 Mattias Asper, Swedish football goalkeeper